The canton of Quissac is an administrative division of the Gard department, southern France. Its borders were modified at the French canton reorganisation which came into effect in March 2015. Its seat is in Quissac.

It consists of the following communes:
 
Aigremont
Boucoiran-et-Nozières
Bragassargues
Brignon
Brouzet-lès-Quissac
Canaules-et-Argentières
Cardet
Carnas
Cassagnoles
Colognac
Corconne
Cros
Cruviers-Lascours
Domessargues
Durfort-et-Saint-Martin-de-Sossenac
Fressac
Gailhan
Lédignan
Lézan
Liouc
Logrian-Florian
Maruéjols-lès-Gardon
Massanes
Massillargues-Attuech
Mauressargues
Monoblet
Montagnac
Moulézan
Moussac
Ners
Orthoux-Sérignac-Quilhan
Puechredon
Quissac
Saint-Bénézet
Saint-Félix-de-Pallières
Saint-Jean-de-Crieulon
Saint-Jean-de-Serres
Saint-Nazaire-des-Gardies
Saint-Théodorit
Sardan
Sauve
Savignargues
Tornac
Vic-le-Fesq

References

Cantons of Gard